Bishop Ryan Catholic Secondary School is a Catholic secondary school located in Hannon, Ontario. It was founded in 1958 and is under the authority of the Hamilton-Wentworth Catholic District School Board.

History 
Although construction began the year before, Bishop Ryan Catholic Secondary School was officially opened on April 16, 1959, by Joseph Francis Ryan, then Bishop of Hamilton. At that time, the school was located on Queenston Road.

On February 4, 1991, the students and staff started the second semester in the new location, a former public elementary school, on Albright Road. The old building on Queenston Road was demolished; a housing community called Ryan's Walk now occupies the land.

A third Bishop Ryan Catholic Secondary School building opened in January 2014 after delays in construction during late 2013. The 73-hectare site is at 1824 Rymal Road East and Dakota Boulevard in the community of Hannon. The school was designed by Svedas Architects Inc. and was built by Tambro Construction. In September 2015, the Hamilton-Wentworth Catholic District School Board transferred the site of the former school building on Albright Road to Ridgecrest Estates Inc. The building has since been demolished and condominiums have been constructed on the site.

The school is currently headed by principal Michael Lawlor.

Enrollment 
In 2017, just four years after the new building opened, the total headcount at Bishop Ryan was 1,753 students. The yearly student growth had increased by 15 percent over the past two years, meaning there was around an additional 263 new students entering. As of 2020, the Ministry of Education lists Bishop Ryan's enrollment as 2,165.

Co-curricular groups and teams 
Bishop Ryan is home to a number of sports teams and co-curricular groups. Notable examples include the Bishop Ryan Xpression vocal ensemble, Bishop Ryan wrestling team, and the robotics team Celt-X-5406. The school has been noted for its musical talent due to its vocal ensemble group.

Feeder schools 
 Our Lady of the Assumption
 Our Lady of Hope
 St. James the Apostle
 St. John the Baptist
 St. Luke
 St. Mark
 St. Matthew
 St. Paul

Notable alumni 
 Brandon Bizior – pop rock singer and finalist on YTV's The Next Star Season 3
 David Brown – professional ice hockey goaltender drafted by the Pittsburgh Penguins
 Ben Chiarot – professional ice hockey defenceman drafted by the Atlanta Thrashers, played for the Winnipeg Jets, Montreal Canadiens, Florida Panthers, and Detroit Red Wings
 Sheila Copps – former member of Parliament and Deputy Prime Minister of Canada
 John Corbacio – assistant coach of the Toronto Raptors and the Canada men's national basketball team
 Dean Lickyer – rock band known for their appearance on the MuchMusic show disBand, later signed to Underground Operations
 Kyle McKnight – former guitarist of Metalcore band Threat Signal
 Sean O'Sullivan – former member of Parliament and Director of Vocations at the Roman Catholic Archdiocese of Toronto
 Alex Re – guitarist of Melodic Hardcore band Counterparts
 Jamieson Rees – professional ice hockey forward drafted by the Carolina Hurricanes
 Filomena Tassi – Canadian federal minister
 Tony Valeri – former Canadian federal minister
 Rachael Vanderwal – professional basketball player, 2012 Olympian and 2018 Commonwealth Games silver medalist representing Great Britain
 Chris Woodcroft – Olympic wrestler representing Canada in 1988 and 1992
 Greg Woodcroft – Olympic wrestler representing Canada in 1996
 Arber Xhekaj – professional ice hockey defenceman signed by the Montreal Canadiens

See also 
 List of secondary schools in Ontario

References

External links 
 
 
 
 

High schools in Hamilton, Ontario
Catholic secondary schools in Ontario
Educational institutions established in 1959
1959 establishments in Ontario
Relocated schools